Emer Anne Costello (born 3 September 1962) is a former Irish Labour Party politician who served as a Member of the European Parliament (MEP) for the Dublin constituency from 2012 to 2014, Lord Mayor of Dublin from 2009 to 2010 and a Dublin City Councillor for the North Inner City area from 2003 to 2012.

She is from County Louth, and has a B.A. and a H.Dip. in Education from University College Dublin.

She was first co-opted onto Dublin City Council as a member for the North Inner City area in 2003 to replace her husband, Joe Costello, who resigned following the end of the dual mandate. She was elected in 2004 and re-elected in June 2009. She was elected Lord Mayor of Dublin by a unanimous vote of the city council at its annual meeting on 15 June 2009, with the support of Fine Gael and the Green Party.
e
Costello has observed international elections in Cambodia, South Africa and Bosnia and Herzegovina.

Her sister is former Senator Mary Moran.

Costello replaced Proinsias De Rossa in the European Parliament when he resigned as an MEP in February 2012. She lost her seat at the 2014 European Parliament election.

References

External links

 

1962 births
Living people
Labour Party (Ireland) MEPs
MEPs for the Republic of Ireland 2009–2014
Politicians from County Louth
Lord Mayors of Dublin
Irish schoolteachers
Alumni of University College Dublin
21st-century women MEPs for the Republic of Ireland